The Foxborough Regional Charter School is a college prep, K through 12, charter school located in Foxborough, Massachusetts, United States.

History 
Founded as the SABIS Foxborough Regional School, a member of the SABIS international network of private charter schools, Foxborough Regional Charter School, or FRCS, opened at the start of the 1998 school year with 582 students in grades kindergarten through eighth. To accommodate their growing student population's need for a practical cafeteria and gym, the school built a cafetorium in 1999, which served as a gymnasium during gym class, and a cafeteria during lunch hours. In 2000, a new wing was built to allow for more elementary students. In 2001 a temporary, six-classroom modular building was installed for the middle school students. In January 2012, a new $16,000,000 facility was completed and now holds the middle and high school students. The former middle school classrooms were converted into elementary school rooms.

FRCS split from SABIS in 2007 due to conflicts between SABIS' proprietary curriculum and Massachusetts' guidelines for charter schools.

References

External links
 

1998 establishments in Massachusetts
Charter schools in Massachusetts
Educational institutions established in 1998
Public elementary schools in Massachusetts
Buildings and structures in Foxborough, Massachusetts
Public middle schools in Massachusetts
Public high schools in Massachusetts